Illinois Route 152 is an east–west state road entirely within Perry County, Illinois. It connects Illinois Route 13 and Illinois Route 127 at its western terminus with U.S. Route 51 in Du Quoin at its eastern terminus. According to the Illinois Department of Transportation, daily traffic on IL 152 is 2650 on the western half and 2800 on the eastern half.

Route description 
IL 152 begins in Pyatts at a four-way rural intersection. Perry County Route 4 continues west past the intersection, and the concurrency of IL 13 and IL 127 heads north and south. The highway, which is locally known as Main Street for its entire length, heads east from this intersection toward Du Quoin. It intersects with several local roads and crosses two creeks before meeting Perry County Route 25 at a 3-way intersection  from its western end. After passing CR 25, the road heads northeast for a short distance before turning east into Du Quoin. CR 7 picks up the Main Street name and continues east into downtown Du Quoin, and US 51 travels north and south from the junction. IL 152 is one of the shorter routes on the Illinois State Highway System.

History 
The road which is currently Route 152 first appeared on Illinois highway maps in 1924, though it was not marked at the time. This road was removed from the state highway map in 1926 and returned to the map in 1928 as Route 152. The routing of Illinois 152 has not changed since its inception as part of the second set of SBI Routes in 1924.

Major intersections

References 

152
Transportation in Perry County, Illinois